The Swiss Finance Institute (SFI) is a national center for research, doctoral training, knowledge exchange, and continuing education in the fields of banking and finance. Created in 2006 as a public–private partnership, SFI is a common initiative of the Swiss finance industry, six leading Swiss universities, and the Swiss Confederation.

Organization
Under the auspices of the Swiss Bankers Association, the Institute was formed in 2005 as a foundation domiciled in Zurich with seed capital of 75 million Swiss francs. SFI began its activities at the beginning of 2006 to keep the Swiss banking and finance industry at the top of its field. The institute's faculty comprises more than 75 professors from the Swiss Federal Institute of Technology in Lausanne, the ETH (Swiss Federal Institute of Technology) Zurich, the Universities of Geneva, the University of Lausanne, the University of Lugano, the University of St. Gallen, and the University of Zurich.

The foundation is mandated and supported by the Swiss banking industry, the Swiss stock exchange SIX Swiss Exchange, the Swiss Confederation, and its partner universities. Correspondingly, its Foundation Board consists of personalities from business and academia. In addition to managers from Swiss banks, members of the Board include Prof. Christian Schwarzenegger, Vice-President of the University of Zurich, Prof. Lorenzo Cantoni, Deputy Rector of the University of Lugano, and Prof. Frédéric Herman, Rector of the University of Lausanne. The Chairman of the SFI Foundation Board is Dr. Stefan Seiler, Group Head Human Resources, UBS AG. Dr. Markus Diethelm, General Counsel & Member of the Executive Board, Credit Suisse Group AG, and Dr. Romeo Lacher, Chairman of the Board of Directors of Julius Baer Group Ltd. & Bank Julius Baer & Co. Ltd., act as Vice-Chairmen.

Until he took office as member of the governing body of the Swiss National Bank at the beginning of 2010, the Institute was headed by Prof. Jean-Pierre Danthine. For nine years prior to this, he directed the «International Center FAME for Financial Asset Management and Engineering». Between February 2011 and October 2016 the Institute was under the direction of Prof. Claudio Loderer. As of November 2016 Swiss Finance Institute is headed by Prof. François Degeorge.

Activities
Fundamental research by SFI professors plants the seeds for new financial ideas and provides fertile ground for innovation. Since 2006, the more than 75 SFI professors have published more than 100 articles on banking and finance in top-level academic journals such as the American Economic Review, Econometrica, the Journal of Finance, the Journal of Financial Economics, and the Review of Financial Studies. They can also be found in the database of the Social Science Research Network (SSRN) in New York.

Notes and references

See also
Professional certification in financial services
New York Institute of Finance
Amsterdam Institute of Finance
The London Institute of Banking & Finance

Research institutes in Switzerland
Banking schools
Finance in Switzerland